Magdalena: Anghel sa Putikan is a Philippine television drama series broadcast by GMA Network. The series is based on Nuevas' comic book series, Kukulayan Ko ang Langit. Directed by Gina Alajar, it stars Bela Padilla in the title role. It premiered on October 8, 2012 on the network's Afternoon Prime line up replacing Faithfully. The series concluded on January 18, 2013 with a total of 75 episodes. It was replaced by Forever in its timeslot.

The series is streaming online on YouTube.

Cast and characters

Lead cast
 Bela Padilla as Magdalena "Lena" Fuentebella-Soriano / Angela Natividad
A poor young lady blessed with stunning beauty and a pure heart. A deeply religious lass whose twin aspirations are to alleviate the life of her loved ones and start her own family life with her one great love, Abel. But her humble dreams are shattered and her fate changes drastically with the intrusion of an evil man that will lead her to suffer into much miserable and complicated world.

Supporting cast
 Dion Ignacio as Abel Soriano
A poor gentleman who luckily captivated Lena's heart. He is handsome in scruffy sort of way and works as a tricycle driver. Though he proves himself worthy of Lena's love, the latter's parents resent him, and their relationship as well, obviously because of his status in life.
 Ryan Eigenmann as Baron Villa de Asis
A corrupt and unscrupulous businessman who will do the utmost to obtain whatever he desires, no matter what it takes. A devil in disguise who promised Luding and Dolpo a million peso life, just to make Lena his wife. But instead of marrying her, Baron abuses Magdalena and forces her to work as an escort girl.
 Pauleen Luna as Carol Fuentebella
The mean-spirited and social climber stepsister of Lena. Cunning and never running out of schemes, Carol is the type of person who will do anything to acquire everything she wants, even if it means hurting the people around her in the process.
 Pancho Magno as Jet Collado
An aspiring model whose good looks and charismatic nature made him a certified "chick magnet". He is a knight-in-shining-armor who will help Lena to get back on her feet and will eventually fall in love with her.
 Irma Adlawan as Ludivina "Luding" Fuentebella
Lena and Carol’s ambitious, greedy and conceited mother and wife to Dolpo. In her quest to have an easy and comfortable life, she ends up pushing her daughter Lena to the arms of the evil, Baron Villa de Asis.
 Allan Paule as Rodolpo "Dolpo" Fuentebella
Lena’s pervert stepfather. A lazy drunkard and a gambling man who wants to get rich but refuses to work. He will do anything for money, even if it means selling his stepdaughter.
 Lexi Fernandez as Fatima "Timay" Natividad
A young prostitute who will become Lena’s closest friend. Indeed, a hapless victim of fate’s cruel game, Timay dreams to escape the dark world she’s in and creates a perfect home of her own someday.
 Sharmaine Arnaiz as Charito "Chato" Natividad / Amparo Reyes 
A former prostitute and the biological mother of Lena. In order to give her daughter a good life, she left Lena under the care of Luding.
 Maria Isabel Lopez as Julia "Huling" Hermodo
The best friend and confidante of Chato. She also helps Lena to escape her bitter life under Baron Villa de Asis.
 Deborah Sun as Cecilia "Selya" Soriano
The protective mother of Abel & aunt of Ben. She rejects Lena for her son because she doesn't want to be connected with the latter’s parents, who are well-known gamblers.
 Via Antonio as Siony
The friend of Lena. Like the latter, she also works as a seamstress in a garment factory. Her boldness and vivacity always bring cheer to the usually problematic Lena.
 Bodie Cruz as Deo
The right-hand man and trusted lackey of Baron Villa de Asis.
 Mercedes Cabral as Kim
Working for her pimp boss, Baron [with whom she’s in love] as an escort girl. She envies Lena, as the spotlight is turned for the latter, but the two will eventually become allies.
 Chariz Solomon as Ms. Roxy
The assistant of Baron in the prostitution den, who eventually become friends with Lena.

Guest cast
 Vivo Ouano as Obet
 Prince Stefan as Ice Rivero
 Alvin Aragon as Raki
 Mayton Eugenio as Dessa
 Chuckie Dreyfus as Ben
 Nathalie Hart as Chloe
 Pinky Amador as Madame Z

Production

Development
Originally created by the network's resident writer and creative consultant, RJ Nuevas, the series is actually based on Filipino Komiks graphic novel, Kukulayan Ko ang Langit (lit. I Will Paint the Heaven), which also penned by Nuevas. The show began developing early 2012 as part of network's offering for the last quarter of the year. Nuevas said that the network's executives want him to create a more realistic, more mature drama. Then he thought of his old komiks creation, Kukulayan Ko Ang Langit, which is about a naive provincial girl forced by circumstances to become an escort girl. Nuevas doesn't look at this story as merely sexy drama but more of a display of how a woman will face life's challenging situations and fight for her right. This series is somewhat an advocacy against human trafficking and promotion of women empowerment. "Admit it or not, this is what real life is all about. It really happens. Compared to some drama series, this one is shockingly realistic," he added.

Casting
Bela Padilla was chosen to play the title role in Magdalena: Anghel sa Putikan. She sees the role she plays as a strong woman versus just another vixen. "Magdalena is a real person. The protagonist-antagonist type just like many people, whether they admit it or not. This is the reason why I didn't peg my characterization on anyone. I want understanding and execution of my portrayal to come from within. I want to do something that feels natural for me," she added. The role  challenged her ability to act as natural as she can be. Most of the scenes in the show's pilot week will see her crying buckets. "I am challenged, starting with the first two weeks (of our taping). My character is too weak and so naive. I'm like that in real life because I trust everyone too much. Sometimes when I cry, it feels like it hits me," Padilla says.

The producer hired actress and television director, Gina Alajar to handle the series. Padilla feels so lucky that her director in the series is Alajar. "She really guides me and challenges me to give my best in every scene," she says. "It feels like, she's giving me a personal acting workshop to make sure that my performance will be superb," she added. Prior to this project, Alajar and Padilla have worked as co-stars in hit afternoon drama, Hiram na Puso.

Actors, Dion Ignacio, Ryan Eigenmann and Pancho Magno portrayed Padilla's romantic interests in the series. Ignacio played Abel. "This is my biggest role ever. I have a lot of scenes, most of them dramatic, plus I am playing a matured role," he says. Adding to the pressure is that this is his first acting assignment under Gina Alajar. "She's very strict when it comes to acting. She wants to feel your acting or else she’d ask you to repeat the scene over and over again until she gets what she wants from you," he added. Both Ignacio and Padilla had a three-day workshop with the director, included a "sensuality workshop", because their roles require bed scenes and kissing scenes. "We should be at ease with each other that’s why Direk Gina asked us to undergo the sensuality workshop," relates Ignacio.

On the other hand, series' director, Alajar is pleased to work with her son Ryan Eigenmann who played the main antagonist, Baron. "This is not the first time I am directing my son. I've directed him in Kirara, Ano Ang Kulay ng Pag-ibig? before. He was still a newbie in acting then. We also worked in an Eat Bulaga drama special for Holy Week," she recalled. When it comes to Eigenmann's evolution as an actor, Alajar said that: "Ryan is one person who consults me whenever he has a new project. He would ask for advice. Before we started taping, after he had read the script, we already discussed how I wanted to treat his role. I also asked him his thought regarding the role that he is playing. On our first taping day, I was surprised because he had a lot of nuances with regards to his role. So I would say his evolution as an actor was very good," she says.

Pauleen Luna portrayed the series' main female antagonist, Carol. Luna admits she wants to rest from playing villain roles but she accepted doing the show as it'll give her the chance to work with Alajar as director. "I know I'll learn a lot from her," she says. Also, Luna stated that her role here is quite different from all her anti-hero roles she done in her past television series."I usually played as wealthy contravida in my previous series. Here, I played a poor and very ambitious villain," she added.

Ratings
According to AGB Nielsen Philippines' Mega Manila household television ratings, the pilot episode of Magdalena earned a 15.1% rating. While the final episode scored an 18.1% rating.

References

External links
 

2012 Philippine television series debuts
2013 Philippine television series endings
Filipino-language television shows
GMA Network drama series
Television shows set in the Philippines